The Balao class was a successful design of United States Navy submarine used during World War II, and with 120 boats completed, the largest class of submarines in the United States Navy. An improvement on the earlier , the boats had slight internal differences. Tang actually achieved a depth of  during a test dive,
and exceeded that test depth when taking on water in the forward torpedo room while evading a destroyer.

Design 

In late 1941, two of the Navy's leading submarine designers, Captain Andrew McKee and Commander Armand Morgan, met to explore increasing diving depth in a redesigned Gato. Fortunately, in 1944 a redesigned Gould centrifugal pump replaced the noisy early-war pump, and effective diving depth was increased.

The Balaos incorporated the fairwater, conning tower and periscope shears reduction efforts that were being retrofitted to the Gatos and the preceding classes in the original design, refining the reductions and reducing the sail to the smallest practical size. By the time the boats began to be launched, lessons learned from patrol reports had been worked into the design and the bridge and sail proved to be efficiently laid out, well equipped, and well liked by the crews.

For the masts and periscope shears, the original arrangement for both the Government and Electric Boat designs had (forward to aft) the two tapered cone shaped periscope support shears, followed by a thin mast for the SJ surface search radar, and then by a thin mast for the SD air search radar. There were minor differences in how the periscopes were braced against vibration, but both designs were nearly identical. About halfway through their production run, Electric Boat altered their design, moving the SJ radar mast forward of the periscopes, then altered it again a few boats later by enlarging the SD radar mast. Late in the war, many Balaos built with the original design had the SD air search radar moved slightly aft onto a thickened and taller mast. These mast arrangements, along with the tremendous variation in the gun layout as the war progressed account for the numerous exterior detail differences among the boats, to the point that at any given time no two Balaos looked exactly alike.

Propulsion 

The propulsion of the Balao-class submarines was generally similar to that of the preceding Gato-class. Like their predecessors, they were true diesel-electric submarines: their four diesel engines powered electrical generators, and electric motors drove the shafts. There was no direct connection between the main engines and the shafts.

Balao-class submarines received main engines from one of two manufacturers. Fairbanks-Morse supplied Model 38D8⅛ opposed piston engines, and General Motors ' Cleveland Diesel division supplied Model 16-248 and 16-278A V16 engines. Earlier Fairbanks-Morse boats received a 9-cylinder version of the Model 38D8⅛, while boats from  onward received 10-cylinder engines. Earlier GM boats received Model 16-248 engines, but beginning with  Model 16-278A engines were used. In each case, the newer engines had greater displacement than the old, but were rated at the same power; they operated at lower mean effective pressure for greater reliability. Both the F-M and GM engines were two-stroke cycle types.

Two manufacturers supplied electric motors for the Balao class. Elliott Company motors were fitted primarily to boats with Fairbanks-Morse engines. General Electric motors were fitted primarily to boats with General Motors engines, but some Fairbanks-Morse boats received GE motors. Allis-Chalmers motors were to be used in SS-530 through SS-536, but those seven boats were cancelled before even receiving names.

Earlier submarines carried four high-speed electric motors (two per shaft), which had to be fitted with reduction gears to slow their outputs down to an appropriate speed for the shafts. This reduction gearing was very noisy, and made the submarine easier to detect with hydrophones. Eighteen late Balao-class submarines received low-speed double armature motors which drove the shafts directly and were much quieter, but this improvement was not universally fitted until the succeeding . On all US World War II-built boats, as the diesel engines were not directly connected to the shafts, the electric motors drove the shafts all the time.

Deck guns

Many targets in the Pacific War were sampans or otherwise not worth a torpedo, so the deck gun was an important weapon. Early Balaos began their service with a /50 caliber Mk. 9 gun. Due to war experience, most were re-armed with a /25 caliber Mk. 17 gun, similar to mounts on battleships and cruisers but built as a "wet" mount with corrosion resistant materials, and with power-operated loading and aiming features removed. This conversion started in late 1943, and some boats had two of these weapons beginning in late 1944. , commissioned in March 1944, was the first newly built submarine with the purpose-built 5-inch/25 submarine mount. Additional anti-aircraft guns included single 40 mm Bofors and twin 20 mm Oerlikon mounts, usually one of each.

Mine armament
Like the previous Tambor/Gar and Gato classes, the Balao class could substitute mines in place of torpedoes. For the Mk 10 and Mk 12 type mines used in World War II, each torpedo could be replaced by as many as two mines, giving the submarine a true maximum capacity of 48 mines. However, doctrine was to retain at least four torpedoes on mine laying missions, which further limits the capacity to 40 mines, and this is often stated as the maximum in various publications. In practice during the war, submarines went out with at least 8 torpedoes, and the largest minefields laid were 32 mines. Post-war, the Mk 49 mine replaced the Mk 12, while the larger Mk 27 mine was also carried which only allowed one mine replacing one torpedo.

Ships in class

This was the most numerous US submarine class; 120 of these boats were commissioned from February 1943 through September 1948, with 12 commissioned postwar. Nine of the 52 US submarines lost in World War II were of this class, along with five lost postwar, including one in Turkish service in 1953, one in Argentine service in the Falklands War of 1982, and one in Peruvian service in 1988. Also,  flooded and sank while fitting out at the Boston Naval Shipyard on 15 March 1945. She was raised but not repaired, and was listed with the reserve fleet postwar until struck in 1958. Some of the class served actively in the US Navy through the middle 1970s, and one (Hai Pao ex-) is still active in Taiwan's Republic of China Navy.

SS-361 through SS-364 were initially ordered as Balao-class, and were assigned hull numbers that fall in the middle of the range of numbers for the Balao class (SS-285 to SS-416 & 425–426). Thus, in some references they are listed with that class. However, they were completed by Manitowoc as Gatos, due to an unavoidable delay in Electric Boat's development of Balao-class drawings. Manitowoc was a follow yard to Electric Boat, and was dependent on them for designs and drawings.

Cancellations 

A total of 125 U.S. submarines were cancelled during World War II, all but three between 29 July 1944 and 12 August 1945. The exceptions were three Tench-class boats, cancelled 7 January 1946. References vary considerably as to how many of these were Balaos and how many were Tenches. This yields 10 cancelled Balao-class, SS-353-360 and 379–380. The Register of Ships of the U. S. Navy differs, considering every submarine not specifically ordered as a Tench to be a Balao, and further projecting SS-551-562 as a future class. This yields 62 cancelled Balao class, 51 cancelled Tench class, and 12 cancelled future class. The cancelled hull numbers, including those launched incomplete, were SS-353-360 (Balao), 379–380 (Balao), 427–434 (Balao), 436–437 (Tench), 438–474 (Balao), 491–521 (Tench), 526-529 (Tench), 530–536 (Balao), 537-550 (Tench), and 551-562 (future).

Service history

World War II

The Balaos began to enter service in mid-1943, as the many problems with the Mark 14 torpedo were being solved. They were instrumental in the Submarine Force's near-destruction of the Japanese merchant fleet and significant attrition of the Imperial Japanese Navy. , the highest-scoring of the class, sank 33 ships totaling 116,454 tons, as officially revised upward in 1980.

Nine Balaos were lost in World War II, while two US boats were lost in postwar accidents. She was renamed the ARA Santa Fe (S-21) and was lost in the 1982 Falklands War after being damaged, when she sank while moored pierside. Santa Fe was refloated and disposed of a few years after the war by being taken out to deep water and scuttled.

Additionally, commissioned but incomplete and still under construction, flooded and sank pierside at the Boston Navy Yard on 15 March 1945, after a yard worker mistakenly opened the inner door of an aft torpedo tube that already had the outer door open. No personnel were lost in the accident and she was raised, decommissioned, and never completed or repaired. Her 42 days in commission is the record for the shortest commissioned service of any USN submarine. Postwar, she was laid up in the Reserve Fleet until stricken in 1958 and scrapped in 1959.

Balao-class losses

Notable submarines
  was second on the list of number of ships sunk with 33 and first on the list of tonnage with 116,454. Her third war patrol was the most successful of any U.S. submarine with 10 ships for 39,100 tons. Sunk in the Taiwan Strait by a circular run of her own torpedo, her skipper Richard O'Kane and eight others escaped; some escaped the submerged wreck with the only known successful use of the Momsen Lung. Tangs survivors were imprisoned by the Japanese for the rest of the war. After his release following the Japanese surrender, Richard O'Kane was awarded the Medal of Honor for his actions commanding Tang during the convoy battles of 24 and 25 October 1944.
 Archerfish sank the aircraft carrier Shinano. Shinano is the largest ship sunk by a submarine. Commander Enright was awarded the Navy Cross.

Postwar service history

Postwar, 55 Balaos were modernized under the Fleet Snorkel and Greater Underwater Propulsion Power (GUPPY) programs, with some continuing in US service into the early 1970s. Seven were converted to roles as diverse as guided-missile submarines (SSG) and amphibious transport submarines (SSP). 46 were transferred to foreign navies for years of additional service, some into the 1990s, and  remains active in Taiwan's Republic of China Navy as Hai Pao.

Naval Reserve trainer

Interested in maintaining a ready pool of trained reservists, the Navy assigned at least 58 submarines from 1946 to 1971 to various coastal and inland ports (even in Great Lakes ports like Cleveland, Chicago, and Detroit), where they served as training platforms during the Reservists' weekend drills. At least 20 Balao-class boats served in this capacity. In this role, the boats were rendered incapable of diving and had their propellers removed. They were used strictly as pierside trainers. These were in commission but classed as "in service in reserve", thus some were decommissioned and recommissioned on the same day to reflect the change in status.

Foreign service

The large numbers of relatively modern, but surplus U.S. fleet submarines proved to be popular in sales, loans, or leases to allied foreign navies. 46 Balao-class submarines were transferred to foreign navies, some shortly after World War II, others after serving nearly 30 years in the US Navy. These included 17 to Turkey, 2 to Greece, 3 to Italy, 2 to the Netherlands, 5 to Spain, 2 to Venezuela, 4 to Argentina, 5 to Brazil, 2 to Chile, 2 to Peru, 1 to Canada and 1 to Taiwan. One of the Venezuelan boats, ARV Carite (S-11) formerly USS Tilefish (SS-307), featured in the 1971 film Murphy's War with some cosmetic modification.

GUPPY and other conversions

At the end of World War II, the US submarine force found itself in an awkward position. The 111 remaining Balao-class submarines, designed to fight an enemy that no longer existed, were obsolete despite the fact they were only one to three years old. The German Type XXI U-boat, with a large battery capacity, streamlining to maximize underwater speed, and a snorkel, was the submarine of the immediate future. The Greater Underwater Propulsion Power Program (GUPPY) conversion program was developed to give some Balao- and Tench-class submarines similar capabilities to the Type XXI. When the cost of upgrading numerous submarines to GUPPY standard became apparent, the austere "Fleet Snorkel" conversion was developed to add snorkels and partial streamlining to some boats. A total of 36 Balao-class submarines were converted to one of the GUPPY configurations, with 19 additional boats receiving Fleet Snorkel modifications. Two of the GUPPY boats and six of the Fleet Snorkel boats were converted immediately prior to transfer to a foreign navy. Most of the 47 remaining converted submarines were active into the early 1970s, when many were transferred to foreign navies for further service and others were decommissioned and disposed of.

Although there was some variation in the GUPPY conversion programs, generally the original two Sargo batteries were replaced by four more compact Guppy (GUPPY I and II only) or Sargo II batteries via significant re-utilization of below-deck space, usually including removal of auxiliary diesels. All of these battery designs were of the lead-acid type. This increased the total number of battery cells from 252 to 504; the downside was the compact batteries had to be replaced every 18 months instead of every 5 years. The Sargo II battery was developed as a lower-cost alternative to the expensive Guppy battery. All GUPPYs received a snorkel, with a streamlined sail and bow. Also, the electric motors were upgraded to the direct drive double-armature type, along with modernized electrical and air conditioning systems. All except the austere GUPPY IB conversions for foreign transfer received sonar, fire control, and Electronic Support Measures (ESM) upgrades.

The Fleet Snorkel program was much more austere than the GUPPY modernizations, but is included here as it occurred during the GUPPY era. The GUPPY and Fleet Snorkel programs are listed in chronological order: GUPPY I, GUPPY II, GUPPY IA, Fleet Snorkel, GUPPY IIA, GUPPY IB, and GUPPY III.

GUPPY I

Two Tench-class boats were converted as prototypes for the GUPPY program in 1947. Their configuration lacked a snorkel and was not repeated, so no Balaos received this conversion.

GUPPY II

This was the first production GUPPY conversion, with most conversions occurring in 1947–49. Thirteen Balao-class boats (Clamagore, and ) received GUPPY II upgrades. This was the only production conversion with Guppy batteries.

GUPPY IA

This was developed as a more cost-effective alternative to GUPPY II. Nine Balao-class boats (and ) were converted in 1951–52. The less expensive Sargo II battery was introduced, along with other cost-saving measures.

Fleet Snorkel

The Fleet Snorkel program was developed as an austere, cost-effective alternative to full GUPPY conversions, with significantly less improvement in submerged performance. Twenty-three Balao-class boats (and ) received this upgrade, six immediately prior to foreign transfer. Most Fleet Snorkel conversions occurred 1951–52. Unlike the GUPPY conversions, the original pair of Sargo batteries were not upgraded. Each boat received a streamlined sail with a snorkel, along with upgraded sonar, air conditioning, and ESM. The original bow was left in place, except on three boats (Piper, Sea Owl, and Sterlet) that received additional upper bow sonar equipment. A few boats initially retained the 5"/25 deck gun, but this was removed in the early 1950s.

GUPPY IIA

This was generally similar to GUPPY IA, except one of the forward diesel engines was removed to relieve machinery overcrowding. Thirteen Balao-class boats (Diodon, and ) received GUPPY IIA upgrades in 1952–54. One of these, Diodon, had previously been upgraded to GUPPY II.

GUPPY IB

This was developed as an austere upgrade for two Gato-class and two Balao-class boats ( and ) prior to transfer to foreign navies in 1953–55. They lacked the sonar and electronics upgrades of other GUPPY conversions.

GUPPY III

Nine submarines, six of them Balaos (Clamagore, Cobbler, Corporal, Greenfish, Tiru, and Trumpetfish), were upgraded from GUPPY II to GUPPY III in 1959-63 as part of the Fleet Rehabilitation and Modernization II (FRAM II) program. All except Tiru, the pilot conversion, were lengthened by 15 feet in the forward part of the control room to provide a new sonar space, berthing, electronics space, and storerooms. Tiru was lengthened only 12.5 feet, and both forward diesel engines were removed. The other GUPPY IIIs retained all four engines. A taller "Northern" sail was included, to allow improved surfaced operations in rough seas; this was also backfitted to some other GUPPYs. The BQG-4 Passive Underwater Fire Control Feasibility Study (PUFFS) sonar system, with its three tall domes topside, was fitted. Additionally, fire control upgrades allowed the Mark 45 nuclear torpedo to be used.

Radar picket

The advent of the kamikaze demonstrated the need for a long range radar umbrella around the fleet. Radar picket destroyers and destroyer escorts were put into service, but they proved vulnerable in this role as they could be attacked as well, leaving the fleet blind. A submarine, though, could dive and escape aerial attack. Four submarines including the Balao-class boat Threadfin prototyped the concept at the end of World War II but were not used in this role. Ten fleet submarines were converted for this role 1946-53 and redesignated SSR as radar picket submarines.  was the only Balao-class SSR. Experiments on the first two SSR submarines under the appropriately named Project Migraine I showed that placement of the radars on the deck was inadequate and that more room was needed for electronics. Thus Burrfish was given the Migraine II (project SCB 12) conversion, which placed a Combat Information Center (CIC) in the space formerly occupied as the aft battery room. The after torpedo room was stripped and converted into berthing, and the boat lost two of her forward torpedo tubes to make room for additional berthing and electronics. The radars were raised up off the deck and put on masts, giving them a greater range and hopefully greater reliability.

The SSRs proved only moderately successful, as the radars themselves proved troublesome and somewhat unreliable, and the boats' surface speed was insufficient to protect a fast-moving carrier group. The radars were removed and the boats reverted to general purpose submarines after 1959. Burrfish was decommissioned in 1956 and, with her radar equipment removed, transferred to Canada as HMCS Grilse (SS-71) in 1961.

Guided-missile submarine

The Regulus nuclear cruise missile program of the 1950s provided the US Navy with its first strategic strike capability. It was preceded by experiments with the JB-2 Loon missile, a close derivative of the German V-1 flying bomb, beginning in the last year of World War II. Initially the missile was carried on the launch rail unprotected, thus the submarine was unable to submerge until after launch. Cusk was eventually fitted with a watertight hangar for one missile and redesignated as an SSG. Following a brief stint as a cargo submarine,  was converted in 1955 to carry two surface-launched Regulus missiles and was redesignated as an SSG, joining the Gato-class  in this role. She made strategic deterrent patrols with Regulus until 1964, when the program was discontinued in favor of Polaris. A number of fleet boats were equipped with Regulus guidance equipment 1953–64, including Cusk and Carbonero following the Loon tests.

Transport submarine

Initially, they were equipped with a watertight hangar capable of housing a Landing Vehicle Tracked (LVT), and retained one 5-inch (127 mm)/25 caliber deck gun for shore bombardment. Both torpedo rooms and one engine room were gutted to provide space for embarked Special Operations Forces (SOF) and their equipment. Snorkels were fitted. Due to the extra personnel, to avoid excessive snorkeling they were equipped with a  scrubber and extra oxygen storage. Initially, a squadron of 12 SSPs was considered, capable of landing a reinforced Marine battalion, but only two Balao-class SSPs (out of four overall) were actually converted. Perch landed British commandos on one raid in the Korean War, and operated in the Vietnam War from 1965 until assignment to Naval Reserve training in 1967 and decommissioning in 1971, followed by scrapping in 1973. Sealion operated in the Atlantic, deploying for the Cuban Missile Crisis and numerous SOF-related exercises. She was decommissioned in 1970 and expended as a target in 1978. The LVT hangar and 5-inch gun were removed from both boats by the late 1950s. They went through several changes of designation in their careers: ASSP in 1950, APSS in 1956, and LPSS in 1968.

Sonar test submarine

 was redesignated as an auxiliary submarine (AGSS) in 1949 and converted to a sonar test submarine in 1958–59 to test a system known as LORAD. This included a  extension aft of the forward torpedo room, with  swing-out arrays near the bow. Later, three large domes were installed topside for a wide aperture array.

Cargo submarine

 Barbero was converted to a cargo submarine and redesignated as an SSA in 1948. The forward engine room, after torpedo room, and all reload torpedo racks were gutted to provide cargo space. From October 1948 until March 1950, she took part in an experimental program to evaluate her capabilities as a cargo carrier. Experimentation ended in early 1950, and she was decommissioned into the reserve on 30 June 1950. In 1955, she was converted to a Regulus missile submarine and redesignated as an SSG.

Operational submarines 

As of 2007 , a Balao-class submarine, was one of the last two operational submarines in the world built during World War II. The boat was transferred to Taiwan's Republic of China Navy in the early 1970s. The Tench-class ex- is the other one. They are named Hai Pao and Hai Shih, respectively, in Taiwanese service.

Museums 

Six Balao-class submarines are open to public viewing. They primarily depend on revenue generated by visitors to keep them operational and up to U.S. Navy standards; each boat gets a yearly inspection and a "report card". Some boats, like Batfish and Pampanito, encourage youth functions and allow a group of volunteers to sleep overnight in the crew's quarters.

Surviving ships 
The following is a complete list of Balao-class museum boats:
 at War Memorial Park in Muskogee, Oklahoma
 at Independence Seaport Museum in Philadelphia
 at USS Bowfin Submarine Museum & Park in Honolulu
 at Battleship Cove in Fall River, Massachusetts
 at San Francisco Maritime National Historical Park in San Francisco
 at Arkansas Inland Maritime Museum in North Little Rock, Arkansas

 served as a museum boat at Patriots Point in Charleston, South Carolina until being closed in 2021 and scrapped two years later. As of 2022, efforts to find a new home for this vessel have been unsuccessful.

Surviving parts 

 USS Halfbeak (SS-352) at New Jersey Naval Museum in Hackensack, New Jersey (Sail)
 USS Baya (SS-318) at Vallejo Naval and Historical Museum in Vallejo, California (Periscope)
 USS Pintado (SS-387) at National Museum of the Pacific War in Fredericksburg, Texas (Conning Tower)
 USS Parche (SS-384) at USS Bowfin Submarine Museum & Park in Honolulu (Conning Tower)
 USS Balao (SS-285) at Washington Navy Yard in Washington D.C. (Conning Tower)

See also 
 List of most successful American submarines in World War II
 List of lost United States submarines
 Allied submarines in the Pacific War
List of ship classes of the Second World War
List of Balao-class Submarines

References

Citations

Bibliography
 
 
 
 
 
  Different pagination than 1977 edition.

External links 

 On Eternal Patrol, website for lost US subs
 Fleet Type Submarine Training Manual San Francisco Maritime Museum
 Description of GUPPY conversions at RNSubs.co.uk
 GUPPY and other diesel boat conversions page (partial archive)
 Navsource.org fleet submarines photo index page
 https://web.archive.org/web/20140322093118/http://www.fleetsubmarine.com/sublist.html
 DiGiulian, Tony Navweaps.com later 3"/50 caliber gun
 DiGiulian, Tony Navweaps.com 4"/50 caliber gun
 DiGiulian, Tony Navweaps.com 5"/25 caliber gun

Submarine classes
 
 Balao class
 Balao class
 Balao class
 Balao class